The women's sprint event at the 2022 World Singles Ninepin Bowling Classic Championships was held in Elva, Estonia on 25 May 2022.

World Champion became representative of host - Estonia Heret Ots thus winning the first world championship gold medal in history for his country. Silver was won by Czech Hana Wiedermannová, while bronze medals went to semi-finalists Serbian Jasmina Anđelković and Slovenian Eva Sajko.

Results

Starting places 
The starting places have been allocated on the basis of each nation achievements during the previous championships.

Draw 
The players were drawn into bouts with the reservation that competitors from the same country can not play in the first round against each other.

References 

2022
Women's sprint